Vladyslav Leonidovych Zaychuk (born 15 November 1980 in Makiivka, Donetsk Oblast, Ukrainian SSR) is a Ukrainian football midfielder who plays for Helios Kharkiv.

External links 
 Profile on Official Website

1980 births
Living people
Sportspeople from Makiivka
Ukrainian footballers
FC Naftovyk-Ukrnafta Okhtyrka players
Association football midfielders
FC Elektron Romny players
FC Mashynobudivnyk Druzhkivka players
FC Shakhtar-2 Donetsk players
FC Shakhtar Makiivka players
FC Kharkiv players
FC Arsenal Kharkiv players
FC Helios Kharkiv players